The 2003 Asian Women's Volleyball Championship was the twelfth edition of Asian Championship, a biennial international volleyball tournament organised by the Asian Volleyball Confederation (AVC) with Volleyball Federation of Vietnam (VFV). The tournament was held in Ho Chi Minh City, Vietnam from 20 to 27 September 2003.

Pools composition
The teams are seeded based on their final ranking at the 2001 Asian Women's Volleyball Championship.

Preliminary round

Pool A

|}

|}

Pool B

|}

|}

Classification 9th–10th

|}

Final round

Quarterfinals

|}

5th–8th semifinals

|}

Semifinals

|}

7th place

|}

5th place

|}

3rd place

|}

Final

|}

Final standing

Awards
MVP:  Zhao Ruirui
Best Scorer:  Choi Kwang-hee
Best Spiker:  Miyuki Takahashi
Best Blocker:  Zhao Ruirui
Best Server:  Yang Hao
Best Setter:  Yoshie Takeshita
Best Digger:  Fan Hsin-wen
Best Receiver:  Zhang Na
Miss Volleyball:  Pham Thi Kim Hue

References
Results
www.jva.or.jp

V
A
Asian women's volleyball championships
V